Heptamelus is a genus of sawflies belonging to the family Tenthredinidae.

The species of this genus are found in Europe and Japan.

Species:
 Heptamelus dahlbomi (Thomson, 1870)
 Heptamelus ochroleucus (Stephens, 1835)

References

Tenthredinidae
Sawfly genera